Shurovo is a rural locality (a village) in Yaganovskoye Rural Settlement, Cherepovetsky District, Vologda Oblast, Russia. The population was 18 as of 2002.

Geography 
Shurovo is located 31 km north-west of Cherepovets (the district's administrative centre) by road. Yaganovo is the nearest rural locality.

References 

Rural localities in Cherepovetsky District